Perl is an open-source computer programming language.

Perl may also refer to:

 Perl 6, the previous name of Raku, an open-source programming language related to Perl
 Perl, Saarland, a municipality in Saarland, Germany

People
 Perl D. Decker (1875–1934), a United States House Representative from Missouri
Perl Karpovskaya (1897–1970), birth name of Polina Zhemchuzhina, Soviet politician, best known as the wife of  the Soviet foreign minister Vyacheslav Molotov

Surname
 Alfredo Perl (born 1965), Chilean-German pianist and conductor
Gisella Perl (1907–1988), Jewish Holocaust survivor and author
 Hille Perl (born 1965), German musician (viola da gamba, lirone)
Martin Lewis Perl (1927–2014), an American physicist and Nobel Prize laureate
 Rafał Perl (born 1981), Polish diplomat

See also
 Pearl (disambiguation)
 Perle (disambiguation)
 Perles (disambiguation)
 Perls
 Purl (disambiguation)